Casey Jarrett Beathard (born November 16, 1993) is an American football quarterback for the Jacksonville Jaguars of the National Football League (NFL). He played college football at Iowa and was drafted in the third round of the 2017 NFL Draft by the San Francisco 49ers.

Early years
Beathard attended Battle Ground Academy in Franklin, Tennessee. He played high school football for the Battle Ground Academy Wildcats. After his high school football career, he committed to the University of Iowa to play college football.

College career

2012 season
Beathard redshirted during his freshman year at Iowa.

2013 season
In the 2013 season, Beathard appeared in a limited role in five games for the Hawkeyes. On September 21, he made his collegiate debut against Western Michigan. Against the Broncos, he had a 54-yard completion and four rushes for 30 yards. On November 9, against Purdue, he had his first career collegiate touchdown on a five-yard rush. He added another rushing touchdown in his next appearance against Nebraska on a four-yard rush. In the Outback Bowl against LSU, he threw his first career touchdown pass to teammate Kevonte Martin-Manley in the fourth quarter of the 21–14 loss. Overall, in the 2013 season, Beathard had 179 passing yards, one touchdown, two interceptions, 49 rushing yards, and two rushing touchdowns.

2014 season
Beathard continued his role as a backup in the 2014 season. In the first half against Pitt, starter Jake Rudock suffered a minor injury and Beathard took the field to begin the second half, with the Hawkeyes trailing 17–7. While Pitt had been dominant throughout much of the first half, the team gained a new energy in the second half with Beathard under center. Beathard would take the Hawkeyes to a 24–20 victory.

After a last-minute loss to non-conference in-state rival Iowa State, who would eventually go 2–10 (winless in conference play), fans in the community were vocal with their criticisms of the Iowa coaching staff, citing the conservative play calling, unused potential of players, and the apparent apathy of head coach Kirk Ferentz. Ferentz was in his 16th year of coaching the Hawkeyes, and his contract as head coach was guaranteed until 2020, an extension offered after their 2010 Orange Bowl victory against Georgia Tech when the Hawkeyes finished their season 11–2. Iowa fans were impressed by Beathard's energy against Pitt, and his comeback victory sparked debate about his position as a starter.

Beathard started the following game against Purdue, where Iowa won 24–10. Following their bye week, Rudock was declared healthy by Ferentz, and returned as a starter against Indiana, where they won 45–29. Fan criticism of the program continued throughout the season, as the team continued to lose against the better part of their schedule.

The criticism, informally called the "Iowa quarterback controversy", revolved primarily around Beathard being the deserving man of the starting spot, while some fervent fans called for the firing of Ferentz. The public criticism of the coaching staff was so strong that Iowa athletic director Gary Barta spoke publicly on multiple occasions in support of Ferentz in regards to the issue.

With Rudock at the helm for the remainder of the season, Iowa would go on to defeat Northwestern by a surprisingly large margin in a 48–7 home victory but was defeated in an equally grand way at Minnesota the following week, losing 51–14. Wisconsin, and Nebraska, conference rivals and two of the toughest games on Iowa's 2014 schedule, came to Kinnick Stadium in the final two games of the regular season. Wisconsin, with Heisman runner-up halfback Melvin Gordon, avoided an upset and defeated Iowa 26–24; the Hawkeyes came up short against Nebraska as well, losing in overtime, 37–34, after blowing a 17-point lead.

Iowa received a bid to the TaxSlayer Bowl against Tennessee, and pressure from fans and the media left the Iowa coaching staff uncertain and the need to make a solid decision. Beathard's father, Casey Beathard, made statements to The Tennessean, a local Tennessee media outlet, stating that his future would be evaluated after the game, and that "he's hoping he doesn't have to transfer". Though taken out of context by media, Casey Beathard  affirmed that it was not a threat of transfer; regardless, Ferentz made an announcement shortly before gameday stating that both quarterbacks would take snaps during the game, hinting at an on-field competition for the spot.

Both Rudock and Beathard took snaps during the Taxslayer Bowl, and the Hawkeyes lost 45–28 to Tennessee. The Volunteers got off to a large start; both Rudock and Beathard had poor drives during the first half, but Beathard handled the majority of second-half snaps. Beathard was able to rally the Hawkeyes from a 35–7 first-half deficit, though they were not able to win the game.

Shortly after the TaxSlayer Bowl loss, Kirk Ferentz released a depth chart for the following 2015 season—a very irregular time for a coach to do so—which named Beathard the starting quarterback for the 2015 season. Rudock, who in 2014 was a senior and preparing to graduate, had been being recruited by new Michigan coach Jim Harbaugh; and, after Beathard was officially named next season's starter, Rudock transferred to the University of Michigan for graduate study and for his one year of graduate eligibility.

2015 season
Beathard helped lead the 2015 Iowa Hawkeyes football team to an undefeated 12–0 record during the regular season, as he passed for 2,570 yards, 14 touchdowns, and three interceptions. He was selected by both the coaches and media as a second-team player on the 2015 All-Big Ten Conference football team. The Hawkeyes' winning streak came to an end in the 16–13 loss to Michigan State in the Big Ten Championship. Beathard passed for 216 yards, one touchdown, and one interception in the loss. In the Rose Bowl against Stanford, Beathard passed for 239 yards, two touchdowns, and one interception in the 45–16 loss.

2016 season
In his final season with the Hawkeyes, Beathard helped lead the team to an 8–4 record in the regular season. The team qualified for the Outback Bowl against Florida. The Gators won by a score of 30–3 in Beathard's final collegiate game. Overall, in the 2016 season, Beathard had 1,929 passing yards, 17 touchdowns, and 10 interceptions.

Statistics

Professional career
Beathard received an invitation to play in the 2017 Senior Bowl. He met with representatives from the Chicago Bears during the week of the Senior Bowl, but failed to stand out after a week of practices. On January 28, 2017, Beathard played for the North team, and was limited to two passes for 4 passing yards and a 12-yard rush as the North lost 15–16 to the South. He attended the NFL combine and performed the vertical jump, broad jump, and positional drills. Due to a hamstring injury, he opted to skip the 40-yard dash, short shuttle, and three-cone drill. On March 27, 2017, Beathard participated at Iowa's pro day along with Desmond King, Jaleel Johnson, George Kittle, Riley McCarron, LeShun Daniels Jr., Cole Croston, Faith Ekakitie, Anthony Gair, Jake Duzey and Ron Coluzzi. He performed the short shuttle, three-cone drill, vertical jump, broad jump, and passing drills for the team representatives and scouts who attended from all 32 NFL teams. At the conclusion of the pre-draft process, Beathard was projected to be a sixth- or seventh-round pick by NFL draft experts and scouts.

San Francisco 49ers
The San Francisco 49ers selected Beathard in the third round (104th overall) of the 2017 NFL Draft. He was the sixth quarterback to be selected that year.

2017 season

On June 12, 2017, Beathard signed his rookie contract, a four-year, $3.52 million with a signing bonus of $706,288. He competed with Matt Barkley and Nick Mullens throughout training camp for the job as the backup quarterback. Head coach Kyle Shanahan named him the backup to Brian Hoyer to begin the regular season.

On October 15, 2017, Beathard made his NFL debut against the Washington Redskins, replacing Hoyer in the second quarter. He played for the rest of the game. In the fourth quarter, he threw his first NFL touchdown, a 45-yard pass to wide receiver Aldrick Robinson. He completed 19 of 36 passes for 245 passing yards, a touchdown, and an interception as the 49ers narrowly lost on the road by a score of 26–24. After the game, Beathard was named the 49ers starter. In Week 7, in a 40–10 blowout loss to the Dallas Cowboys, Beathard was 22-of-38 for 235 yards. In addition, he had 5 carries for 30 yards and his first rushing touchdown. In Weeks 8 and 9, Beathard passed for 461 yards, a touchdown, and three interceptions while also rushing for 56 yards and a touchdown against the Philadelphia Eagles and Arizona Cardinals. The 49ers won their first game of the season in Week 10 over the New York Giants. In the 31–21 victory, Beathard completed 19 of 25 passes for 288 yards, two touchdowns, and an interception while also rushing for 15 yards and a touchdown. One of the touchdowns was for the longest play of his career, an 83-yard pass to wide receiver Marquise Goodwin.

During the 49ers' Week 11 matchup at home to the Seattle Seahawks on November 26, Beathard suffered a leg and hip injury at the end of the 4th quarter and was replaced by recent trade acquisition Jimmy Garoppolo. Although he avoided any serious injury, it was Beathard's final appearance for the 49ers in the 2017 season as Garoppolo was promoted to be the starter a few days later. Beathard finished his rookie season completing 123-of-224 passes (54.9%) for 1,430 yards, four touchdowns, and six interceptions. He also rushed for 136 yards and three touchdowns. Several members of the 49ers have publicly complimented the attitude and toughness of Beathard during the season, as he was sacked 19 times in his 7 appearances.

2018 season
In 2018, the plan was for Beathard to be the backup to Garoppolo. However, Garoppolo tore his ACL during a 38–27 Week 3 loss to the Kansas City Chiefs, making Beathard the starter. On September 30, in a 29–27 loss to the Los Angeles Chargers, Beathard connected with fellow Hawkeye alum tight-end George Kittle for an 82-yard touchdown. Beathard passed for 298 yards, two touchdowns, and two interceptions and also rushed for 19 yards. In a Week 5 loss to the Arizona Cardinals, he had a career-high 349 passing yards, two touchdowns, and two interceptions while also rushing for seven yards and a touchdown. After playing in Week 8 against the Cardinals, Beathard suffered a wrist injury. Nick Mullens started the next game against the Oakland Raiders in Beathard's place. Beathard did not appear in any other games in the 2018 season. Overall, Beathard finished his second professional season with 1,252 passing yards, eight touchdowns, and seven interceptions while also rushing for 69 yards and a touchdown.

2019 season
With Jimmy Garoppolo returning from injury and Nick Mullens as the primary backup quarterback, Beathard saw no playing time in the 2019 season.

2020 season
In Week 4 of the 2020 season, Beathard came into the game against the Philadelphia Eagles in relief of Mullens, who was benched. He finished 14 of 19 for 138 yards in the 25–20 loss. In the next game against the Miami Dolphins, he relieved starting quarterback Jimmy Garoppolo during the second half after Garoppolo reinjured his ankle. During the game, Beathard threw for 94 yards and a touchdown during the 43–17 loss. During Week 15 against the Dallas Cowboys, Beathard entered the game after Nick Mullens injured his elbow in the fourth quarter. In the game, Beathard threw for 100 yards, including a 49-yard touchdown to Kendrick Bourne during the 41–33 road loss.

On December 22, 2020, Beathard was named the starter for the 49ers’ Week 16 matchup against the Arizona Cardinals due to Mullens's injury. In the game, Beathard threw for 182 yards and three touchdowns as the 49ers won on the road 20–12. It was Beathard's second winning game in the NFL.

Jacksonville Jaguars
On March 24, 2021, Beathard signed a two-year, $5 million deal with the Jacksonville Jaguars.

On February 24, 2023, Beathard signed a contract extension with the Jacksonville Jaguars.

NFL career statistics

Personal life
Beathard is the son of country music songwriter Casey Beathard, the brother of country music singer Tucker Beathard, the grandson of former NFL executive Bobby Beathard, who was a Pro Football Hall of Famer and the great-nephew of former NFL quarterback Pete Beathard. On December 21, 2019, Beathard's younger brother, Clay, the starting quarterback for the LIU Sharks, was fatally stabbed outside of a bar in Nashville, Tennessee.

References

External links
 

 Jacksonville Jaguars bio
 Iowa Hawkeyes bio

1993 births
Living people
American football quarterbacks
Iowa Hawkeyes football players
Jacksonville Jaguars players
Players of American football from Tennessee
People from Franklin, Tennessee
San Francisco 49ers players